Events during the year 1955 in Northern Ireland.

Incumbents
 Governor - 	The Lord Wakehurst 
 Prime Minister - Basil Brooke

Events
21 July – The BBC brings into service its Divis transmitter, its first permanent facility serving Northern Ireland, marking the launch of a television service for Northern Ireland; the 35 kW transmissions can also be readily received in much of the Republic of Ireland.

Arts and literature
22 March – A fire destroys much of the original rococo interior of Florence Court.

Sport

Football
Irish League
Winners: Linfield

Irish Cup
Winners: Dundela 3 - 0 Glenavon

Births
11 January – Brian Gregory, footballer.
20 January – Joe Doherty, volunteer in the Provisional Irish Republican Army.
25 February – Davy Hyland, Sinn Féin, later independent, MLA.
28 March – John Alderdice, Baron Alderdice, Alliance Party politician and Speaker of the Northern Ireland Assembly 1998–2004.
2 April – Michael Stone, Ulster loyalist paramilitary.
30 April – BJ Hogg, actor (died 2020).
23 June – Ken Reid, television journalist.
6 July – Michael Boyd, theatre director.
1 August – Adrian Logan, television sports presenter and reporter.
27 September
Gerry Convery, Canadian darts player.
Felix Healy, footballer and football manager.
30 September – Frankie Kennedy, traditional flute and tin whistle player and co-founder of Altan (died 1994).
16 October – Kieran Doherty, volunteer in the Provisional Irish Republican Army (died on hunger strike 1981).
7 December – John McClelland, footballer.
Undated
Bríd Brennan, actress.
Billy Hutchinson, Progressive Unionist Party leader.
Paddy McKillen, property investor.

Deaths
22 January – Moira O'Neill, poet (born 1864).
11 April – Margaret McCoubrey, suffragette and pacifist (born 1880 in Scotland).
14 May – Robert Quigg, soldier, recipient of the Victoria Cross for gallantry in 1916 at the Battle of the Somme (born 1885).
18 July – Billy McCandless, footballer and football manager (born 1893).
14 December – Paddy Mayne, international rugby union footballer and decorated soldier (born 1915).
Undated - Unsinkable Sam, ship's cat (born before 1941 in Germany).

See also
1955 in Scotland
1955 in Wales

References